The Old Hall County Courthouse is a historic county courthouse in Gainesville, Georgia. It was added to the National Register of Historic Places on June 8, 1995. It is located at the junction of Spring Street and Green Street. It was built in 1937 with an addition at the rear in 1975.

The courthouse was designed by the Atlanta architecture firm of Daniell & Beutell in the Stripped Classical style. The courthouse was built after a previous county courthouse, built in 1884, was destroyed by a devastating 1936 tornado. The courthouse construction was partially funded by federal emergency relief for rebuilding.
A new courthouse adjacent to the older courthouse was built in 2000-2002.

Gallery

See also
Federal Building and U.S. Courthouse (Gainesville, Georgia)
National Register of Historic Places listings in Hall County, Georgia

References

External links
Hall County website

Hall County Courthouse
Courthouses on the National Register of Historic Places in Georgia (U.S. state)
Buildings and structures in Hall County, Georgia
Government buildings completed in 1937
Gainesville, Georgia
National Register of Historic Places in Hall County, Georgia
1937 establishments in Georgia (U.S. state)